Lérida is a town and municipality in the Tolima department of Colombia. The population of the municipality was 20,153 as of the 1993 census.

Municipalities of Tolima Department